Liotyphlops is a genus of blind snakes in the family Anomalepididae. The genus is native to  Central America and South America. It contains 13 species that are recognized as being valid.

Geographic range
Species of Liotyphlops are found in Central America and South America from Costa Rica to Paraguay.

Species

T) Type species.

Nota bene: A taxon author in parentheses indicates that the species was originally described in a genus other than Liotyphlops.

References

Further reading
Peters W (1881). "Einige herpetologische Mittheilungen. 1. Uebersicht der zu den Familien der Typhlopes und Stenostomi gehörigen Gattungen oder Untergattungen ". Sitzungberichte der Gesellschaft Naturforschender Freunde zu Berlin 1881 (4): 69-71. (Liotyphlops, new genus, p. 69). (in German).
Freiberg M (1882). Snakes of South America. Hong Kong: T.F.H. Publications. 189 pp. . (Genus Liotyphlops, pp. 84, 86 + drawing of head scalation on p. 84).
Goin CJ, Goin OB, Zug GR (1978). Introduction to Herpetology, Third Edition. San Francisco: W.H. Freeman. xi + 378 pp. . (Genus Liotyphlops, p. 311).

Anomalepididae
Snake genera
Taxa named by Wilhelm Peters